Georgi Karakanov (born 2 March 1970) is a former Bulgarian professional footballer, who played as a midfielder.

References

External links
 

1975 births
Living people
Bulgarian footballers
First Professional Football League (Bulgaria) players
Second Professional Football League (Bulgaria) players
People from Dupnitsa
PFC Minyor Pernik players
FC Lokomotiv 1929 Sofia players
PFC Spartak Varna players
PFC Marek Dupnitsa players
Neftochimic Burgas players
PFC Chernomorets Burgas players
FC Septemvri Simitli players
Association football midfielders
Sportspeople from Kyustendil Province